A performing arts center is a multi-use performance space or cluster of spaces.

Performing Arts Center may also refer to:
Performing Arts Center (Kansas City)
Performing Arts Center of Los Angeles County
Performing Arts Center (Manhattan)
The Performing Arts Center at Purchase

See also